Empheremyia is a genus of parasitic flies in the family Tachinidae. There are at least two described species in Empheremyia.

Species
These two species belong to the genus Empheremyia:
 Empheremyia atra Bischof, 1904
 Empheremyia leopoldiensis (Brauer, 1897)

References

Further reading

 
 
 
 

Tachinidae
Articles created by Qbugbot